Sclerolaena fimbriolata is a species of flowering plant in the family Amaranthaceae, native to central Western Australia. A small shrub, it is typically found growing on the edges of gypsum salt lakes.

References

fimbriolata
Endemic flora of Australia
Flora of Western Australia
Plants described in 1978